Deputy Dawg is a Terrytoons cartoon character, featured on the animated television series of the same name that aired from 1960 to 1964.

Background
The character of Deputy Dawg originated in 1959 as part of a projected series entitled Possible Possum, intended as a component of the Captain Kangaroo Show. Larz Bourne came up with the series concept and drew the first storyboards. Midway through production, the project was overhauled as a standalone series; Deputy Dawg became the star, and "Possible" was rechristened Muskie Muskrat, to avoid comparisons with Walt Kelly's comic strip character Pogo Possum. A later, less Kelly-inspired Terrytoons character would eventually take the Possible Possum name.

The Deputy Dawg Show first ran weekly from January 1, 1960 to December 31, 1964. Each episode has a Deputy Dawg cartoon, followed by Sidney the Elephant. The British television debut came on BBC Television on August 31, 1963.

The cartoons are between four and six minutes long, and were packaged three at a time and shown as a half-hour program. The show was produced by CBS and was the professional animation debut of Ralph Bakshi (as animator) of adult animation fame.

The cartoons originally featured Deputy Dawg, an anthropomorphic dog, as a deputy sheriff in Florida, although as the episodes progressed, the location changed to Mississippi, and later to Tennessee. The other main characters are the "varmints" Muskie Muskrat, Ty Coon, Vincent van Gopher, and Pig Newton, as well as Dawg's boss the Sheriff and his wife Mrs. Deputy. A wilder addition to the cast was the "space varmint" Astronut, a mischievous alien visitor who was later given his own spin-off show.

Deputy Dawg was voiced by Dayton Allen, a prolific voice actor who voiced many Terrytoons characters in television and theatrical shorts in the 1950s and 1960s.

Much of the comedy in the cartoons is sight gag/action-based, with additional humor provided by comical dialects and stereotypical southern characteristics. Many storylines involve Deputy Dawg battling with peculiar locals and trying to please the Sheriff, as well as protecting his produce from Muskie and Vince. However, most of Muskie's and Vince's crimes are not taken very seriously, enabling Deputy Dawg to pal around with them when they are not causing trouble. The trio often engage in their favorite pastime, fishing for catfish.

Musical direction was by Terrytoons standby Philip A. Scheib (April 14, 1894–April 1969), who at the time had recently worked on the Oscar-nominated Terrytoons shorts Sidney's Family Tree (1958) and The Juggler of Our Lady (1958). The Deputy Dawg musical accompaniment often features a distinctive bass harmonica.

Deputy Dawg later appeared in episodes of the 1987 series Mighty Mouse: The New Adventures.

Deputy Dawg also appeared in the 1999 pilot Curbside.

Home video
Children's Video issued "Terrytoons Good Guys" compilation VHS tapes in 1985 which included one Deputy Dawg cartoon per tape.

Video Treasures issued five "Deputy Dawg" VHS tapes in 1989. The tape catalogue numbers are listed below for the titles released.

Episode guide

Season 1 (1960) 
{| class="wikitable"
|+
!No.
Overall
!No. in
season
!Title
!Directed by
!Story by
!Date
!Prod.
code
!VHS Tape Number
|-
|1
|1
|The Yoke's On You
|Dave Tendlar
|Larz Bourne
|1960
|657
|-
|2
|2
|Space Varmint
|Connie Rasinski
|Larz Bourne
|1960
|659
|-
|3
|3
|Shotgun Shambles
|Dave Tendlar
|Larz Bourne
|1960
|660
|-
|4
|4
|Seize You Later, Alligator
|Dave Tendlar
|Larz Bourne
|1960
|663
|-
|5
|5
|Li'l Whooper
|Dave Tendlar
|Larz Bourne
|1960
|666
|-
|6
|6
|Welcome, Mischa Mouse
|Martin Taras
|Larz Bourne
|1960
|672
|TT 2606
|-
|7
|7
|Cotton-Pickin' Picnic
|Connie Rasinski
|Eli Bauer
|1960
|673
|TT 2606
|-
|8
|8
|Henhouse Hassle
|Mannie Davis
|Larz Bourne
|1960
|674
|TT 2606
|-
|9
|9
|Law and Disorder
|Dave Tendlar
|Bob Kuwahara
|1960
|675
|TT 2606
|-
|10
|10
|Rabid Rebel
|Mannie Davis
|Larz Bourne
|1960
|676
|TT 2606
|-
|11
|11
|Friend Fox
|Dave Tendlar
|Eli Bauer
|1960
|677
|TT 2603
|-
|12
|12
|Deputy Dawg's Nephew
|Mannie Davis
|Bob Kuwahara
|1960
|683
|TT 2606
|-
|13
|13
|Dog-Gone Catfish
|Connie Rasinski
|Larz Bourne
|1960
|684
|TT 2603
|-
|14
|14
|National Spoof Day
|Mannie Davis
|Eli Bauer
|1960
|685
|TT 2607
|-
|15
|15
|Aig Plant
|Dave Tendlar
|Larz Bourne
|1960
|691
|TT 2607
|-
|16
|16
|Creek Mud Monster
|Connie Rasinski
|Eli Bauer
|1960
|693
|TT 2607
|-
|17
|17
|Duped Deputy
|Mannie Davis
|Al Bertino & Dick Kinney
|1960
|694
|TT 2607
|-
|18
|18
|Home Cookin|Dave Tendlar
|Larz Bourne
|1960
|695
|TT 2607
|-
|19
|19
|Penguin Panic
|Mannie Davis
|Bob Kuwahara
|1960
|697
|TT 2603
|-
|20
|20
|People's Choice
|Connie Rasinski
|Al Bertino & Dick Kinney
|1960
|698
|TT 2603
|-
|21
|21
|Kin Folk
|Dave Tendlar
|Al Bertino & Dick Kinney
|1960
|700
|TT 2603
|-
|22
|22
|Lynx, th' Jinx
|Mannie Davis
|Larz Bourne
|1960
|701
|TT 2607
|-
|23
|23
|The Bird Burglar
|Dave Tendlar
|Kin Platt
|1960
|703
|TT 2603
|-
|24
|24
|Watermelon Watcher
|Connie Rasinski
|Larz Bourne
|1960
|704
|n/a
|-
|25
|25
|Dragon, My Foot
|Mannie Davis
|Eli Bauer
|1960
|705
|n/a
|-
|26
|26
|Star for a Day
|Connie Rasinski
|Al Bertino & Dick Kinney
|1960
|706
|n/a
|}

 Season 2 (1961–1962) 

 Season 3 (1963-1964) 

CreditsDirection: Art Bartsch, Bob Kuwahara, Connie Rasinski, Dave Tendlar, Mannie Davis, Ralph BakshiStory Supervisor: Tom MorrisonStories: Larz Bourne, Eli Bauer, Bob Kuwahara, Al Bertino, Dick KinneyAnimation: Cosmo Anzilotti, Ralph Bakshi, Doug Crane, Mannie Davis, Eddie Donnelly, Dick Hall, John Gentilella, Larry SilvermanDesign and Layout Supervisor: Art BartschDesign and Layout: Martin Strudler, John ZagoBackgrounds: Bill Focht, Bill HillikerMusic: Phil ScheibVoices: Dayton AllenPhotography: George Davis, Ted Moskowitz, Joseph RasinskiEditing: George McAvoy, Jack MacConnellProduction Manager: Frank SchuddeExecutive Producer''': Bill Weiss

See also
 The Astronut Show''

References

External links 

Deputy Dawg at Toonopedia
Deputy Dawg at Little Gems

1960s American animated television series
1970s American animated television series
1960 American television series debuts
1972 American television series endings
1960s American police comedy television series
1970s American police comedy television series
American children's animated comedy television series
Animated television series about dogs
CBS original programming
Fictional characters from Tennessee
Anthropomorphic dogs
Fictional police officers
NBC original programming
Television series by CBS Studios
Terrytoons characters
Male characters in animation
Television shows adapted into comics
Television series by Terrytoons
First-run syndicated television programs in the United States
Television shows set in Florida
Television shows set in Mississippi
Television shows set in Tennessee